Kamil Małecki (born 2 January 1996) is a Polish professional racing cyclist, who currently rides for UCI ProTeam . In October 2020, he was named in the startlist for the 2020 Giro d'Italia.

Major results

2017
 2nd Overall Carpathian Couriers Race
1st Stage 2
 6th Overall Dookoła Mazowsza
2018
 1st Grand Prix Doliny Baryczy Milicz
 8th Trofeo Matteotti
2019 
 1st  Overall CCC Tour - Grody Piastowskie
1st Stage 1b
 1st  Overall Bałtyk–Karkonosze Tour
1st Stage 4 (ITT) 
 4th Memoriał Andrzeja Trochanowskiego
 5th Grand Prix Gazipasa
 5th Memoriał Romana Siemińskiego
 5th Grand Prix Poland, Visegrad 4 Bicycle Race
2020
 6th Overall Tour de Pologne

Grand Tour general classification results timeline

References

External links
 

1996 births
Living people
Polish male cyclists
People from Bytów County